Saint Agericus (also called Algeric, or Aguy; c. 521 in Verdun (possibly Harville) – 588), was the 10th Bishop of Verdun, and an advisor to King Childebert II of Austrasia.

He was born to a poor family, his parents having prayed for many years to be given a child. His mother gave birth to him in a field where she was working (hence the name Agericus; its meaning in Latin: ager field + icus of or pertaining to) He served as pastor at the Church of Saints Peter and Paul.

In 554 he succeeded Saint Desideratus as Bishop of Verdun.

He was known to perform miracles, and as a great helper to the poor of the region (parts of modern-day France, Germany, Belgium, and Luxembourg). 
He was a signatory of the Treaty of Andelot in 587.

His feast day is celebrated each year by Roman Catholics on December 1.

References

Bishops of Verdun
Year of birth unknown
588 deaths